The Fred E. Chambers House and Grounds, located in Eugene, Oregon, United States, is listed on the National Register of Historic Places.

See also
 National Register of Historic Places listings in Lane County, Oregon

References

External links
Oregon Historic Resources Inventory
NRHP Nomination

1923 establishments in Oregon
Colonial Revival architecture in Oregon
Houses completed in 1923
Houses on the National Register of Historic Places in Eugene, Oregon